The small-headed elaenia (Elaenia sordida), also known as the Brazilian elaenia, is a species of bird in the family Tyrannidae, the tyrant flycatchers. It is found in southeastern Brazil, eastern Paraguay, and northeastern Argentina.

Its natural habitats are subtropical or tropical moist lowland forests, subtropical or tropical moist montane forests, subtropical or tropical moist shrubland, and heavily degraded former forest.

References

small-headed elaenia
Birds of Brazil
Birds of Paraguay
Birds of the Selva Misionera
Birds of the South Region
small-headed elaenia
small-headed elaenia